Siim-Sander Vene (born 12 November 1990) is an Estonian professional basketball player for Hapoel Jerusalem of the Israeli Basketball Premier League and the Basketball Champions League. Standing at 2.03 m (6 ft 8 in), he plays both the small forward and power forward positions. Vene represents the Estonian national basketball team internationally, and was named Estonian Basketball Player of the Year in 2017, 2018 and 2019.

Professional career
Vene began playing basketball with Siili Palliklubi and TTÜ. In 2006, Vene moved to Lithuania and joined Žalgiris' junior team Žalgiris-Arvydas Sabonis school. With Žalgiris, Vene won the Nike International Junior Tournament in 2007 and the Nacionalinė krepšinio lyga (NKL) in 2008. Vene was loaned to Kaunas Triobet of the Lietuvos krepšinio lyga (LKL) for the 2008–09 season.

In the 2009–10 Euroleague, Vene averaged 2 points, 1.8 rebounds and 0.2 assists per game.

In October 2010, Vene was loaned to Kaunas, and in December 2010, to Ludwigsburg of the Basketball Bundesliga (BBL).

In 2011, Vene joined Baltai (former Kaunas) on loan from Žalgiris. In February 2012, he was loaned to VEF Rīga of the Latvijas Basketbola Līga (LBL).

On 27 September 2012, Vene was loaned to Prienai. Prienai finished the 2012–13 season in fourth place.

In July 2013, Vene returned to Žalgiris. In the 2013–14 Euroleague, Vene averaged 3 points, 2.6 rebounds and 0.6 assists per game, as Žalgiris reached Top 16. Vene won his first Lithuanian Championship in the 2013–14 season, after defeating Neptūnas 4 games to 2 in the finals. In the 2014–15 season, Vene averaged 3.4 points, 1.2 rebounds and 0.5 assists per game in the Euroleague and won his second Lithuanian Championship, after Žalgiris defeated league rivals Lietuvos rytas 4–0 in the finals. In the 2015–16 Euroleague, Žalgiris once again reached Top 16, but failed to advance to the playoffs with a 2–12 record. Vene averaged 3.3 points, 1.6 rebounds and 0.7 assists per game. He won his third consecutive Lithuanian Championship in the 2015–16 season, after Žalgiris defeated Neptūnas in the finals.

On 8 August 2016, Vene signed with Nizhny Novgorod of the VTB United League. He was named Estonian Basketball Player of the Year in 2017.

On 16 August 2017, Vene signed with Reggiana of the Lega Basket Serie A (LBA). On 29 September, he was sidelined for three months due to a leg injury and didn't play any games for Reggiana. On 4 January 2018, it was announced that Vene will sign for LBA club Varese for the remainder of the 2017–18 season. On 21 June 2018, he was named Estonian Basketball Player of the Year for the second consecutive year.

On September 5, 2018, Vene signed a six-week deal with Manresa of the Liga ACB as a replacement for the injured Justin Doellman. He was released from the team when his contract ended. He signed with another Liga ACB team Fuenlabrada in December 2018. Only a week later Vene moved to another Liga ACB team Gran Canaria after making use of his opt-out for signing with a EuroLeague team.

On July 1, 2019 he signed contract with Varese of the LBA. He returns to Varese after a season with three different Spanish teams.
On May 24, 2020 Vene signed a contract with Fuenlabrada, making a return to the Spanish club where he had already a stint in 2018. 

On September 28, 2021, he signed a 2-month contract with Limoges CSP of the LNB Pro A.

On January 4, 2022, he signed with Pallacanestro Varese of the Italian Lega Basket Serie A (LBA).

On August 9, 2022, he signed with Hapoel Jerusalem of the Israeli Premier League.

National team career
Vene was a member of the Estonian national under-18 basketball team that competed at the 2007 FIBA Europe Under-18 Championship and finished the tournament in 12th place. Vene averaged 12.1 points, 5 rebounds and 1 assist per game.

As a member of the senior Estonian national team, Vene competed at the EuroBasket 2015, averaging 10 points, 6.4 rebounds and 1.6 assists per game. Estonia finished the tournament in 20th place.

Vene was named the captain of the Estonian national team in 2020 ahead of the EuroBasket 2021 qualification games.

Personal life
Vene's father, Priit, and mother, Lea, were both basketballers. His father is now a basketball coach. Vene's younger brother, Kent-Kaarel, is also a professional basketball player.

Career statistics

EuroLeague

|-
| style="text-align:left;"| 2009–10
| style="text-align:left;"| Žalgiris
| 6 || 0 || 10.9 || .417 || .000 || .500 || 1.8 || .2 || .0 || .2 || 2.0 || 1.2
|-
| style="text-align:left;"| 2013–14
| style="text-align:left;"| Žalgiris
| 5 || 0 || 13.7 || .462 || .500 || 1.000 || 2.6 || .6 || .2 || .2 || 3.0 || 3.8
|-
| style="text-align:left;"| 2014–15
| style="text-align:left;"| Žalgiris
| 14 || 0 || 9.2 || .450 || .438 || .714 || 1.2 || .5 || .5 || .0 || 3.4 || 2.6
|-
| style="text-align:left;"| 2015–16
| style="text-align:left;"| Žalgiris
| 20 || 1 || 12.1 || .491 || .300 || .833 || 1.6 || .7 || .4 || .2 || 3.3 || 3.1
|-
| style="text-align:left;"| 2018–19
| style="text-align:left;"| Gran Canaria
| 18 || 4 || 15.0|| .478 || .389 || .842 || 1.2 || .6 || .5 || .0 || 6.8 || 5.1
|- class="sortbottom"
| style="text-align:center;" colspan="2" | Career
| 63 || 5 || 11.2 || .471 || .357 || .789 || 1.5 || .6 || .4 || .1 || 4.2 || 2.8

Domestic leagues

Estonia national team

|-
| style="text-align:left;"| 2005
| style="text-align:left;"| 2005 U-16 European Championship Division B
| style="text-align:left;"| Estonia U-16
| 6 || 4 || 28.0 || .448 || .444 || .583 || 5.2 || .0 || 1.5 || .2 || 13.8
|-
| style="text-align:left;"| 2006
| style="text-align:left;"| 2006 U-16 European Championship Division B
| style="text-align:left;"| Estonia U-16
| 9 || 9 || 34.3 || .372 || .328 || .378 || 9.6 || 3.3 || 2.8 || 1.4 || 16.0
|-
| style="text-align:left;" rowspan=2| 2007
| style="text-align:left;"| 2007 U-18 European Championship
| style="text-align:left;"| Estonia U-18
| 8 || 2 || 26.5 || .430 || .333 || .667 || 5.0 || 1.0 || 1.9 || .8 || 12.1
|-
| style="text-align:left;"| 2007 U-20 European Championship Division B
| style="text-align:left;"| Estonia U-20
| 8 || 0 || 13.3 || .300 || .050 || .500 || 3.3 || .3 || .9 || .0 || 3.8
|-
| style="text-align:left;"| 2009
| style="text-align:left;"| EuroBasket 2009 Qualification Relegation Round
| style="text-align:left;"| Estonia
| 5 || 0 || 14.4 || .400 || .300 || .500 || 2.2 || .2 || .4 || .8 || 4.0
|-
| style="text-align:left;"| 2011
| style="text-align:left;"| EuroBasket 2011 Division B
| style="text-align:left;"| Estonia
| 3 || 0 || 7.7 || .250 || .000 || 1.000 || .0 || .7 || .3 || .0 || 1.3
|-
| style="text-align:left;"| 2012
| style="text-align:left;"| EuroBasket 2013 Qualification
| style="text-align:left;"| Estonia
| 10 || 1 || 25.9 || .551 || .370 || .571 || 6.8 || 1.9 || .7 || .5 || 14.0
|-
| style="text-align:left;"| 2013
| style="text-align:left;"| EuroBasket 2015 First Qualification Round
| style="text-align:left;"| Estonia
| 4 || 0 || 21.3 || .290 || .286 || .833 || 3.3 || 1.5 || 1.0 || 1.5 || 6.3
|-
| style="text-align:left;"| 2015
| style="text-align:left;"| EuroBasket 2015
| style="text-align:left;"| Estonia
| 5 || 2 || 23.2 || .340 || .100 || .667 || 6.4 || 1.6 || .6 || .2 || 7.8
|-
| style="text-align:left;"| 2018
| style="text-align:left;"| 2019 Basketball World Cup Qualification
| style="text-align:left;"| Estonia
| 4 || 4 || 29.0 || .490 || .286 || .750 || 3.2 || 2.2 || 2.8 || .0 || 15.5
|-
| style="text-align:left;"| 2020
| style="text-align:left;"| EuroBasket 2022 qualification
| style="text-align:left;"| Estonia
| 2 || 2 || 31.2 || .542 || .500 || 1.000 || 4.5 || 1.5 || .5 || .0 || 18.5
|-
| style="text-align:left;"| 2021–22
| style="text-align:left;"| 2023 Basketball World Cup Qualification
| style="text-align:left;"| Estonia
| 7 ||   || 26.6 || .262 || .176 || .857 || 4.1 || 2.3 || .4 || .1 || 7.4
|-
| style="text-align:left;"| 2022
| style="text-align:left;"| EuroBasket 2022
| style="text-align:left;"| Estonia
| 5 ||   || 21.1 || .465 || .400 || .875 || 1.6 || 1.0 || .6 || .2 || 11.4

Awards and accomplishments

Professional career
Žalgiris-Arvydas Sabonis school
Nike International Junior Tournament champion: 2007
Lithuanian 2nd division champion: 2008

Žalgiris
3× Lithuanian League champion: 2014, 2015, 2016
Baltic Basketball League champion: 2010
Lithuanian Cup champion: 2015

VEF Rīga
Latvian League champion: 2012

Prienai
Lithuanian Cup champion: 2013

Individual
Estonian Basketball Player of the Year: 2017, 2018, 2019

References

External links
Siim-Sander Vene at basket.ee 
Siim-Sander Vene at euroleague.net
Siim-Sander Vene at fiba.com

1990 births
Living people
Baloncesto Fuenlabrada players
Bàsquet Manresa players
BC Nizhny Novgorod players
BC Žalgiris players
BK VEF Rīga players
CB Gran Canaria players
Estonian expatriate basketball people in Germany
Estonian expatriate basketball people in Italy
Estonian expatriate basketball people in Russia
Estonian expatriate basketball people in Spain
Estonian expatriate basketball people in Latvia
Estonian expatriate basketball people in Lithuania
Estonian men's basketball players
Hapoel Jerusalem B.C. players
Lega Basket Serie A players
Liga ACB players
LSU-Atletas basketball players
Riesen Ludwigsburg players
Pallacanestro Reggiana players
Pallacanestro Varese players
Power forwards (basketball)
Small forwards
Sportspeople from Tartu
TTÜ KK players